The Minnesota State Colleges and Universities system or Minnesota State, previously branded as MnSCU, comprises 30 state colleges and 7 state universities with 54 campuses throughout Minnesota. The system is the largest higher education system in Minnesota (separate from the University of Minnesota system) and the third largest in the United States, educating more than 340,000 students annually. It is governed by a 15-member board of trustees appointed by the governor, which has broad authority to run the system. The Minnesota State system office is located in the Wells Fargo Place building in Saint Paul, Minnesota.

In 2016, the Board of Trustees approved a rebranding of the system to the shortened Minnesota State. This change was met with criticism as this is also the nickname commonly attributed to Minnesota State University, Mankato. The change affected branding but did not alter the legal name of the organization that is identified in state statute. Commonly the system is now being referenced in media as the Minnesota State System, while the institution in Mankato is being referenced as Minnesota State.

History 
In 1991, the Minnesota Legislature issued legislation which founded the creation of the Minnesota State system. Through this process the then-existing Minnesota state university system, community college system and technical college system were combined into a single higher education system. This initially was to be accomplished by 1995 but due to statewide opposition it wasn't until 1997 that a Central Office was formed and individual institutions began to operate under centralized direction.

The members of the University of Minnesota could not be compelled by the legislature to be part of the new system because it had sued for independence in the form of constitutional autonomy from legislative oversight. This autonomy was affirmed by the Minnesota Supreme Court after the State of Minnesota was formed and was a response to lobbying demands from a newly formed Alumni Association of the University of Minnesota in the early 19th century.
 
This difference in independence and power has led to significant differences in the way in which the State system operates and educates students. Through this legislation the State system was given the ad-hoc role of educating all students outside of the doctoral research role that the University of Minnesota, Twin Cities campus provides. In addition, individual university and college members have, by comparison, significantly smaller endowments, and receive less funding from the state government of Minnesota than comparable members of the University of Minnesota system. An appropriation by the state of Minnesota was supposed to cover 66% of the cost to educate students, and as of 2014 the state provides about 50%.

Operations
Minnesota State offers a wide range of collegiate programs from associates degrees to applied doctorates. All of the system's two-year community and technical colleges have an open admissions policy, which means that anyone with either a high school diploma or equivalent degree may enroll. The system also runs an online collaborative called Minnesota Online, which is a gateway to the online course offerings of Minnesota State. More than 150 academic programs are available completely or predominantly online. About 93,300 students took online courses during the 2009-2010 academic year.

The economic impact of the Minnesota State system is estimated to be $8 billion per year, with a return of twelve dollars for every dollar invested.

Tuition at Minnesota State is lower than tuition at the University of Minnesota, private universities, or private trade schools. More than 80 percent of graduates stay in Minnesota to work or continue their education.  The job-placement rate based on the last available data at two-year colleges is 88.0 percent in 2006, meaning that 88.0 percent of graduates find jobs in their chosen fields.

The Minnesota State has not designated an official flagship institution , however, Minnesota State University, Mankato and Saint Cloud State University have been referred to as the system flagship at various points in time.

Member universities and colleges

4-Year State Universities
Bemidji State University
Metropolitan State University
Minnesota State University, Mankato
Minnesota State University Moorhead 
Southwest Minnesota State University 
St. Cloud State University 
Winona State University 

2-Year Community and Technical Colleges: 

Alexandria Technical and Community College
Anoka Technical College
Anoka-Ramsey Community College
Cambridge Campus
Coon Rapids Campus
Central Lakes College
Brainerd Campus
Staples Campus
Century College
White Bear Lake Campus
Mahtomedi Campus
Dakota County Technical College
Rosemount Campus
Fond du Lac Tribal and Community College
Cloquet Campus
Hennepin Technical College
Brooklyn Park Campus
Eden Prairie Campus
Inver Hills Community College
Inver Grove Heights Campus
Lake Superior College
Duluth Campus
Minnesota State Community and Technical College
Detroit Lakes Campus
Fergus Falls Campus
Moorhead Campus
Wadena Campus
Minnesota State College Southeast
Red Wing Campus
Winona Campus
Minneapolis Community and Technical College (MCTC)
Minnesota West Community and Technical College
Canby Campus
Granite Falls Campus
Jackson Campus
Pipestone Campus
Worthington Campus
Normandale Community College
Bloomington Campus
North Hennepin Community College
Brooklyn Park Campus
Minnesota North College
Hibbing Campus
Itasca Campus
Grand Rapids Campus
Mesabi Range Campus
Virginia Campus
Eveleth Campus
Rainy River Campus
International Falls Campus
Vermilion Campus
Ely Campus
Northland Community & Technical College
East Grand Forks Campus
Thief River Falls Campus
Northwest Technical College
Bemidji Campus
Pine Technical and Community College
Pine City Campus
Ridgewater College
Hutchinson Campus
Willmar Campus
Riverland Community College
Austin Campus
Albert Lea Campus 
Owatonna Campus
Rochester Community and Technical College (University Center Rochester)
St. Cloud Technical and Community College
Saint Paul College
South Central College
North Mankato Campus
Faribault Campus

References

External links

 Official website

Public university systems in the United States
 
1995 establishments in Minnesota